Raj Kumar Gaur is an Indian independent politician and member of 15th Legislative Assembly of Rajasthan from Ganganagar (Rajasthan Assembly constituency). He got 49,998 votes and defeated Ashok Chandak of Indian National Congress by the margin of 14,180 votes.

References

Living people
Independent politicians in India
Rajasthan MLAs 2018–2023
1948 births